Year 429 (CDXXIX) was a common year starting on Tuesday (link will display the full calendar) of the Julian calendar. At the time, it was known as the Year of the Consulship of Florentius and Dionysius (or, less frequently, year 1182 Ab urbe condita). The denomination 429 for this year has been used since the early medieval period, when the Anno Domini calendar era became the prevalent method in Europe for naming years.

Events 
 By place 
 Roman Empire 
 Spring – The Vandals, led by Genseric ("Caesar King"), invade North Africa. They land with a force of 80,000 men including Alans, and Germanic tribesmen with their families from the Iberian Peninsula, across the narrow Strait of Gibraltar. The Vandal fleet raids the coasts of the Mediterranean Sea, and blockades the grain and oil supply to Italy.
 Genseric seizes lands from the Berbers and destroys church buildings all over Mauretania. He goes on a rampage forcing Bonifacius, Roman governor, to retreat to the fortified coastal town of Hippo Regius (modern Annaba).
 Bonifacius, weakened by the civil war against empress Galla Placidia, sues for peace and is elevated to the rank of supreme commander (magister militum) of Africa.
 Emperor Theodosius II starts to reform the Codex Theodosianus in Constantinople. He establishes a committee to codify all Roman laws. All funds raised by Jews to support schools have to be turned over to the state treasury.
 The Temple of Goddess Athena on the Acropolis of Athens is sacked. Athenian Pagans are persecuted.

 By topic 
 Literature 

 Religion 
 A Gaulish assembly of bishops dispatch Germanus of Auxerre and Lupus of Troyes to Britain to visit the island. To satisfy pope Celestine I they combat the Pelagian heresy.
 Hilary succeeds his kinsman Honoratus and becomes archbishop of Arles.
 Domnus II, future patriarch of Antioch, is ordained as a deacon.

Births 
 Liu Jun, prince of the Liu Song Dynasty (d. 453)
 Zu Chongzhi, Chinese mathematician (d. 500)

Deaths 
 January 6 – Honoratus, archbishop of Arles
 Heremigarius, military leader of the Suebi

References